Van Rysselberghe is a Dutch surname. Notable people with the surname include:

 Van Rysselberghe family, Belgian family of artists
 Bernard Van Rysselberghe (1905–1984), Belgian cyclist
 Dorian van Rijsselberghe (born 1988), Dutch sailor

Dutch-language surnames